Robert Pfetzing (born 4 October 1959) is a former international speedway rider from America.

Speedway career 
Pfetzing rode in the top tier of British Speedway from 1984–1989, riding for Wolverhampton Wolves and Bradford Dukes.

He reached the Overseas final as part of the Speedway World Championship during the 1988 Individual Speedway World Championship and has twice been on the podium at the United States National Championships.

References 

1959 births
Living people
American speedway riders
Bradford Dukes riders
Wolverhampton Wolves riders